The Nome Cult Trail is a northern Californian historic trail located in present-day Mendocino National Forest which goes along Round Valley Road and through Rocky Ridge and the Sacramento Valley. It is also known as the Konkow Trail of Tears. On August 28, 1863, all Konkow Maidu were to be at the Bidwell Ranch in Chico to be taken to the Round Valley Reservation at Covelo in Mendocino County. Any Native Americans remaining in the area were to be shot. 435 Maidu were rounded up and marched under guard west out of the Sacramento Valley and through to the Coastal Range. 461 Native Americans started the trek, 277 finished. They reached Round Valley on September 18, 1863.

History
The trail was originally used during the mid-19th century to forcibly relocate Native American tribes to the Nome Lackee Indian Reservation near Paskenta, California. The Nomlaki were first placed there in 1854 in an effort to control the tribe as well as protect them from recently arriving settlers.

On 5 July 1863, two children of Sam and Mary Lewis were murdered. Their sister escaped; upon her return, the settlers guessed that at least one of the suspects was from Bidwell's rancheria.

Chico to Colby's Ferry 
Starting at Camp Bidwell, the group traveled ten miles and camped at Colby's Ferry on the Sacramento River to rest, where there was food and water available. While the cavalry rode horses, those unable to travel by foot were brought via wagon along with additional supplies.

Colby's Ferry to Kirkpatrick Ranch 
On 5 September, the group ferried across the Sacramento River and walked another ten miles to Stoney Creek, where the water was too salty to drink. The cavalry forced the weary and tired group to march another five miles before finally resting at Kirkpatrick Ranch. During the hot late Summer night nine Native Americans died from exhaustion and thirst. The mourners were given nearly no time to grieve and forced by the cavalry to march another twelve miles from Kirkpatrick Ranch to James Ranch. During that night more perished from malnutrition and illness.

James Ranch to Lacock Ranch 
On 8 September the Native Americans were forced to hike six miles to Lacock Ranch on Thomas Creek. The wagons which had been transporting elders, children, and those too sick to walk, were returned to Chico at this point, and the group waited for four days along Thomas Creek for a mulepack train from Round Valley.

Mountain Home Camp 
On the fifth day, Captain Starr marched the group of Native Americans to Mountain Home camp, moving them three miles on foot. The party stayed at Mountain Home between 12 and 14 September. When the mule pack train arrived on 14 September, the group set out again, the majority of them on foot; those who were sick but well enough to travel rode muleback; one wagon carried the children. They left behind 150 Maidu who were too ill from malnourishment and the hardship of the journey, with only enough food supplies for a month. The weary group then traveled to camp at Cedar Springs, on a seven-mile hike high into the Coast Range. The next day the group hiked another six miles onward into the mountains, camping at Log Springs.

Log Springs to Round Valley 
On 16 September their only wagon was abandoned at Log Springs. The group continued on foot and many struggled to continue the trip during the ten mile ascent into the mountains to Log Cabin, now known as "Government Camp" camping area. Continuing on, the Maidu were forced to climb the final three mile hike up to elevations beyond , spending their last night on the journey at the junction  of the South and Middle Forks of the Eel River, before their final descent into Round Valley. During the last difficult days of the journey, some mothers reportedly tried to kill their babies fearing their children would be abandoned if they were to die.

When news of the abandonment at Mountain House reached Fort Wright, the commandant Captain Douglas sent Superintendent James Short to bring food to those dying along the trail and several wagon teams to bring them back to the fort. After 13 days, Short was able to save only "a portion of them". According to a later report, Short described the horrific scene:

 ... about 150 sick Indians were scattered along the trail for 50 miles ... dying at the rate of 2 or 3 a day. They had nothing to eat ... and the wild hogs were eating them up either before or after they were dead.

Only slightly more than half of the original 461 members survived the march. Along with the 150 left behind at Mountain House, 32 others died en route, and 2 others escaped before the remaining 277 Maidu eventually arrived at the reservation on 18 September. Left there by the cavalrymen, they had too few supplies for the winter. While this account sounds harrowing, Dorothy Hill writes, "Indian versions of the cruel hardships that their ancestors encountered on the drive to Round Valley are more explicit than the government accounts". Tribal members and their descendants tell stories of impatient soldiers using whips on the marchers, shooting anyone trying to escape, and unburdening mothers of their babies, by beating the children against rocks and trees to quicken their pace.

Historical context
Professor Jesse Dizard, Chair (2018) CSU Chico Department of Anthropology gives the following context:

The Concow Trail of Tears was not an isolated event. Tension between white settlers and Native American communities had been growing for years. The Gold Rush of 1849 brought hundreds of thousands to California, most of them young men who cared very little for the indigenous population and its way of life, or their claims to traditional lands. Indeed, the concept of human rights either did not exist or was strictly reserved for European-Americans. Native Americans were forced from their lands, had their children kidnapped, were forced into indentured servitude, or quite simply were murdered. Retaliatory action from Native Americans was met with swift and often violent retribution.

Current status
A small  section exists and is part of the Nome Cult Mountain House Trail as part of a number of hiking trails in Mendocino National Forest.

References

Native American history of California
Forced migrations of Native Americans in the United States
Historic trails and roads in California
Maidu
Chico, California
Transportation in Mendocino County, California
1863 in the United States
History of Mendocino County, California
History of Butte County, California
Native American genocide
1863 in California